Yasmin Paige is an English actress who is best known for her roles as Jordana Bevan in Submarine, Beth Mitchell in Pramface and Maria Jackson in The Sarah Jane Adventures.

Life and career
Paige was born in London, to a Jewish mother and Muslim Arab Iraqi father. She has acted since the age of four. She made her screen debut in the 2003 film Wondrous Oblivion. Paige also starred in The Mysti Show. She had a reduced role in the second series of The Sarah Jane Adventures to accommodate her GCSEs exams.

Paige appeared in Ballet Shoes, in which she plays one of the leads, Petrova Fossil, and co-starred as "Jordana Bevan" in the 2010 film Submarine. In February and March 2012, Paige played Beth Mitchell in the six-part BBC Three comedy Pramface. She returned to this role for a second series in 2013. She appeared as Nicky in the Channel 4 drama Spoof or Die, which aired on 30 July 2012. In 2014, she had the main role in the E4 teen drama Glue. The series saw her reunite with her The Sarah Jane Adventures co-star Tommy Knight.

Filmography

Television

Radio

Film

Theatre

References

External links

Living people
21st-century English actresses
Actresses from London
English child actresses
English film actresses
English television actresses
English stage actresses

English people of Russian-Jewish descent
English people of Iraqi descent
1991 births